Ictus may refer to:

Music
Ictus, in music and conducting, the instant when a beat occurs 
Ictus, rhythmic marking in Solesmes editions of chant; see Rhythm in Gregorian chant
"Ictus", a 1960s song composed by Carla Bley, American jazz composer
ICTUS Records, independent record label for avant-garde jazz
ICTUS, a Belgian orchestra specialising in contemporary classical music

Other uses
Ichthys (also spelled "ictus", "icthus", and "ichthus"), an early Christian religious symbol
Ictus Theatre, Chile
Ictus, in poetry, a way of indicating a stressed syllable; see Ictus and breve

See also
Palaeoapterodytes ictus, an animal species of the early Miocene or late Oligocene
Nodens Ictus, a British rock band formed in 1986